Jettime A/S, previously known as Jet Time, is a Danish charter airline with its head office in Kastrup, Tårnby Municipality, and its main base at Copenhagen Airport.

History

The airline was originally founded under the name Jet Time by a group of Danish investors, and operated its first flight on 19 September 2006.

In November 2016, it was announced that Jet Time and Scandinavian Airlines (SAS) would end their contract for Jet Time's operation of eight ATR 72-600s on behalf of SAS in early 2017, as SAS wanted to concentrate on larger aircraft. Subsequently, Jet Time had phased out the relatively new ATR aircraft.

The airline announced that it had filed for bankruptcy on 21 July 2020, after having discharged most of its employees in June due to the COVID-19 pandemic. However the airline expected to resume operations following the pandemic under a new company, which was established on 8 June 2020 under the name Jettime. Jet Time's assets were also to be transferred to Jettime, including Jet Time's CEO, a number of key employees, and five of Jet Time's Boeing 737 aircraft, for operations planned to resume by 2022. A new, separate air operator's certificate was subsequently issued to the airline, and operations resumed in July 2021.

Destinations
Jet Time has operated charter flights to destinations including the following:

Fleet

, the Jettime fleet consists of the following aircraft:

Previously operated

The airline operated the following aircraft types prior to its relaunch as Jettime:
ATR 72-500
ATR 72-600
Boeing 737-300
Boeing 737-400
Boeing 737-500

Operations
Jettime operates contract and ad hoc passenger and freight charters throughout Europe, as well as short-notice wet-lease charters for scheduled airlines including Air Greenland, Scandinavian Airlines, and Norwegian Air Shuttle. It has also provided VIP charters for clients including FC Copenhagen, Malmö FF, Mercedes-Benz, Rosenborg BK, and Volkswagen.

References

External links

Official website
Listing at planespotters.net
Listing at airlines-inform.com

Defunct airlines of Denmark
Airlines established in 2006
Companies based in Tårnby Municipality
Transport companies based in Copenhagen